Pigeiros is a former civil parish in the municipality of Santa Maria da Feira, Portugal. In 2013, the parish merged into the new parish Caldas de São Jorge e Pigeiros. It has a population of 1,369 inhabitants and a total area of 5.13 km2.

References

Former parishes of Santa Maria da Feira